This is a List of Awadhi language poets.

Gosvāmī Tulsīdās तुलसीदास, also known as "Tulasī Dāsa" and "Tulsidas" (1532 –1623 ) Awadhi poet and philosopher.
Narottama Dasa, a Gaudiya Vaishnava saint who was responsible for spreading Vaishnava bhakti throughout Odisha in and outside Bengal in India. He had worked in Awadhi.

Malik Muhammad Jayasi (1477–1542) poet who wrote in the Avadhi dialect, known for his work Padmavat.
Rambhadracharya (b.14 January 1950)[β] is a Hindu religious leader, educator, Sanskrit scholar, polyglot, poet, author, textual commentator, philosopher, composer, singer, playwright and Katha artist.
 Jumai Khan Azad (b.5 August 1930, d.29 December 2013) a poet.
Ramai Kaka aka Chandra Bhushan Trivedi popular for Akashvani play 'Bahire Baba' in Awadhi language.

See also
List of Hindi authors
List of Hindi-language poets
List of Indian poets
List of Indian writers

References

Awadhi
Awadhi
Culture of Awadh